Der Landarzt is a German television series that aired for 22 seasons from 1987 to 2013.

During early seasons, the show revolves around country doctor Dr. Karsten Matthiesen who runs a practice in his Northern German hometown of  Deekelsen with the help of his mother Olga.

In season 5, after Karsten has died in an accident, Dr. Uli Teschner succeeds him, until being replaced by Dr. Jan Bergmann in season 18.

Cast
Christian Quadflieg as Dr. Karsten Mattiesen, der Landarzt (1987–1992)
Walter Plathe as Dr. Ulrich Teschner, der Landarzt (1992–2009)
Wayne Carpendale as Dr. Jan Bergmann, der Landarzt (2009–2013)
Gila von Weitershausen as Annemarie Mattiesen (1987–1995)
Antje Weisgerber as Olga Mattiesen (1987–1999)
Heinz Reincke as Eckholm (1987–2010)
Gerhard Olschewski as Hinnerksen (1987–2013)
Gert Haucke as Bruno Hanusch (1987–2004)

See also
List of German television series

External links
 

German medical television series
1990s German television series
2000s German television series
1987 German television series debuts
2013 German television series endings
German-language television shows
ZDF original programming